The Salford Advertiser is a weekly newspaper serving the villages, suburbs and districts of the City of Salford in Greater Manchester, England.

History
Founded in 1982 as The Advertiser, the newspaper merged with the Salford City Reporter in 1997, a newspaper that traces its roots back to The Salford Chronicle, founded in 1868. The 1997 merger went through various names, including the first use of The Salford Advertiser in 1999, returning to that name for good in 2010.

For calendar year 2014, The Salford Advertiser had an average weekly circulation of 67,428. It is published on Thursdays. It was published by Manchester Evening News Media Ltd. (MEN Media Ltd.), until MEN Media was purchased by the Trinity Mirror group in 2010.

Circulation 
The paper serves Barton upon Irwell, Boothstown, Broughton, Broughton Park, Cadishead, Charlestown, Clifton, Eccles, Ellenbrook, Ellesmere Park, Hazelhurst, Higher Broughton, High Town, Irlam, Irlams o' th' Height, Langworthy, Little Hulton, Lower Broughton, Lower Kersal, Monton, Ordsall, Patricroft, Peel Green, Pendlebury, Pendleton, Salford, Salford Quays, Seedley, Swinton, Walkden, Weaste, Winton and Worsley.

Editors

References

External links
 

Newspapers published in Greater Manchester
Mass media in Salford
Newspapers published by Reach plc